Cross Ange: Rondo of Angels and Dragons also known as simply Cross Ange is a Japanese mecha anime television series produced by Sunrise, King Records, Fields, Bandai Namco Entertainment, Bandai Channel and Bandai Namco Creative, with Yoshiharu Ashino serving as director, Mitsuo Fukuda acting as creative producer, Akiko Shikata composing the music and Tatsuto Higuchi handling series scripts. The series aired on Tokyo MX, MBS, TVA, BS11 from October 4, 2014 to March 28, 2015. It was licensed by Sentai Filmworks for a digital and home media release in North America.

Four pieces of theme music are used. The insert song featured in episodes five, nine, and twenty-two is "Necessary", once again performed by Nana Mizuki.

Episode list

Notes

References

Cross Ange